Adrian Chacón Muñoz (born 10 December 1988) is a Cuban track and field sprinter who competes in the 400 metres. He represented his country at the 2016 Rio Olympics. His personal best for the 400 m is 45.91 seconds, set in 2015.

Internationally, he competes mainly with the Cuban 4 × 400 metres relay team. He is a two-time participant at the IAAF World Relays and was a finalist at the 2015 World Championships in Athletics with William Collazo, Raidel Acea and Yoandys Lescay. Medals came with Collazo, Lescay and Osmaidel Pellicier at the 2015 NACAC Championships in Athletics and the Pan American Games. The quartet regrouped for the 2016 Olympic Games and placed sixth in the final with a time of 2:59.53 minutes.

Personal bests
200 metres – 21.23 (2015)
400 metres – 45.91 (2015)
4 × 400 metres relay – 2:59.53 (2016)

All information from All-Athletics profile.

International competitions

References

External links
 
 

Living people
1988 births
Cuban male sprinters
Olympic athletes of Cuba
Athletes (track and field) at the 2016 Summer Olympics
World Athletics Championships athletes for Cuba
Athletes (track and field) at the 2015 Pan American Games
Pan American Games medalists in athletics (track and field)
Pan American Games silver medalists for Cuba
Competitors at the 2018 Central American and Caribbean Games
Central American and Caribbean Games gold medalists for Cuba
Central American and Caribbean Games medalists in athletics
Medalists at the 2015 Pan American Games